The 1974 Barnett Bank Tennis Classic was a women's tennis tournament played on outdoor clay courts at the Orlando Racquet Club in Orlando, Florida in the United States. It was part of the USLTA Women's Circuit of the 1974 WTA Tour. It was the inaugural edition of the tournament and was held from September 22 through September 26, 1974. Unseeded 17-year old Martina Navratilova won the singles title after reaching her first WTA final and, as she was still an amateur, she had to hand over her $10,000 first-prize money to the Czechoslovakian tennis federation.

Finals

Singles
 Martina Navratilova defeated  Julie Heldman 7–6(5–4), 6–4
 It was Navratilova's first singles title of her career.

Doubles
 Françoise Dürr /  Betty Stöve defeated  Rosie Casals /  Billie Jean King 6–3, 6–7(2–5), 6–4

Prize money

References

Barnett Bank Tennis Classic
1974 in sports in Florida
1974 in American tennis